Jalpaiguri district is a district of the Indian state of West Bengal. The district was established in 1869 during British Raj.

The headquarters of the district are in the city of Jalpaiguri, which is also the divisional headquarters of North Bengal.

History
Jalpaiguri district comprises western Dooars and the major part of the eastern Morang and this area, according to Sailen Debnath, in the ancient time was a part of the kingdom of Kamarupa, and since the medieval period it became a part of Kamata kingdom. Sailen writes that three of the five ancient capitals of Kamatapur were geographically in the district of Jalpaiguri; and the three capitals were at Chilapata, Mainaguri and Panchagarh in sequence. According to him, Hingulavas, the first capital of the next Koch kingdom as well was in Jalpaiguri district. Hingulavas has well been identified with Mahakalguri in Alipurduar Sub-Division.

The Dooars were under the control of Kingdom of Bhutan till 1865 when British  East  India company captured the area in the Duar War under the Treaty of Sinchula and were added to the district of Jalpaiguri in 1869.

Geography 

Jalpaiguri is a part of West Bengal which is situated in North Bengal.

The district situated in the northern part of West Bengal has international borders with Bhutan and Bangladesh in the north and south respectively and district borders with Darjeeling hills in the west and northwest and Alipurduar district and Cooch Behar district on the east.

National protected areas include the Gorumara National Park and the Chapramari Wildlife Sanctuary.

Climate
Jalpaiguri is part of monsoon climate zone of South-Eastern Asia. May is the hottest month of this region with average maximum temperature of about  32 °C whereas January is coldest with  11 °C. Highest ever recorded maximum and minimum temperature are 40 °C and 2 °C. The average annual humidity in the district is of 82%. The annual average rainfall is 3160mm. December is the driest month with average rainfall 0.2 mm and July is wettest with 809.3 mm. Number of rainy days are 0 to 1 during November to February and 24 days during July. Thunderstorms are common weather phenomenon during May.

Divisions

Sub-divisions
Jalpaiguri district earlier had three sub-divisions – Jalpaiguri Sadar subdivision, Mal subdivision and Alipurduar subdivision. Alipurduar district was created in June 2014 and Jalpaiguri district was left with two subdivisions – Jalpaiguri Sadar and Mal.

Police stations
There are 16 police stations in the district, viz.:
Banarhat
Bhaktinagar
Binnaguri (Phari)
Chalsa
Dhupguri
Domohani (Phari)
Gairkata
Jalpaiguri (Kotwali)
Kranti Hat (Phari)
Malbazar
Matelli (Phari)
Mainaguri
Nagrakata
New Jalpaiguri
Patkata (Phari)
Rajganj

Telephone districts
There are six telephone area codes of Jalpaiguri district.
They are 03561, 03562, 03563, 03564, 03565, 03566.

Assembly constituencies 
As per order of the Delimitation Commission in respect of the delimitation of constituencies in the West Bengal, the district is divided into seven assembly constituencies:

Malbazar and Nagrakata constituencies are reserved for Scheduled Tribes candidates.  Dhupguri, Maynaguri, Jalpaiguri and Rajganj constituencies are reserved for Scheduled Caste candidates. Along with one assembly constituency from Cooch Behar district, Dhupguri, Maynaguri, Jalpaiguri, Rajganj, Dabgram-Phulbari, and Malbazar constituencies form Jalpaiguri (Lok Sabha constituency), which is reserved for Scheduled Castes.

Transport
One can avail train from the major railway stations in the vicinity like New Jalpaiguri railway station/ Jalpaiguri/ Jalpaiguri Road/ New Maynaguri railway station/ New Mal Junction railway station. By road it is connected with rest of the country.  Air travel is available up to Bagdogra Airport, and from there it is connected by a 20 km expressway from the district border.

Demographics

According to the 2011 census Jalpaiguri district had a population of 3,872,846, roughly equal to the nation of Liberia. This gives it a ranking of 66th in India (out of a total of 640). Its population growth rate over the decade 2001-2011 was  33.77%. Jalpaiguri has a sex ratio of 954 females for every 1000 males, and a literacy rate of 79.79%. After bifurcation the district has a population of 2,381,596. Scheduled Castes and Scheduled Tribes have a population of 1,001,572 (42.05%) and 349,592 (14.68%) of the population respectively.

Religion

Language 

According to the 2011 census, 65.57% of the population spoke Bengali, 12.96% Sadri, 4.90% Nepali, 4.69% Hindi, 2.69% Rajbongshi and 1.39% Kurukh as their first language. Other languages spoken include Santali and Munda. Kurukh and other tribal languages such as Kharia and Mundari were once more widespread among the tea tribes as late as the 1960s, but they have since rapidly shifted to Sadri as their mother tongue.

Flora and fauna
Apart from Gorumara National Park, the district contains Chapramari Wildlife Sanctuary.

Notable people 
This is a list of notable people from Jalpaiguri District.
 
 
 Promode R. Bandyopadhyay, Indian born American inventor, research scientist and Technical Program Manager at the Naval Undersea Warfare Center, New Port, Rhode Island, USA
 P. K. Banerjee, football player and coach who represented India at the international level.
 Swapna Barman, the heptathlete was born here.
 Ratan Lal Basu, a fiction writer in English.
 Moushumi Bhowmik, the eminent singer-songwriter was born here.
 Mimi Chakraborty, Tollywood actress and Member of Parliament from Jadavpur constituency.
 Sukalyan Ghosh Dastidar, Indian footballer of the 1970s
 Bappi Lahiri, Indian singer.
 Samaresh Majumdar, Bengali author of novels like Uttoradhikar, Kalpurush, and Kaalbela.
 Khaleda Zia, Former Prime Minister of Bangladesh during 1991 to 1996 & 2001 to 2006 and leader of Bangladesh Nationalist Party.

Notes

References

External links

 District Website

 
Gorkhaland
Districts of West Bengal
1869 establishments in India